People Say is the second studio album by Swedish musician Christian Falk. It was released on 4 October 2006 through Bonnier Music. The album peaked at number 17 on the Swedish Albums Chart.

Track listing
"Brighter Days" – 1:40
"Dream On" (feat. Robyn & Ola Salo) – 3:09
"Mind Elevation" (feat. Demetrius Price) – 3:56
"Way Home" – 3:49
"Shine" (feat. Pauline) – 3:25
"Something Good" (feat. Vanessa Falk) – 3:10
"C.C.C." (feat. Robyn) – 4:18
"People Say" (feat. Vanessa Falk) – 3:25
"My Heart" (feat. Cindy) – 3:02
"So So Beautiful" – 2:17

Charts

References

2006 albums
Christian Falk albums